Ryan James Huff (born April 13, 2001) is an American professional stock car racing driver who competes part-time in the ARCA Menards Series, driving the No. 36 Ford Fusion for his own team, Huff Racing.

Racing career
In 2020, Huff made his debut in the ARCA Menards Series for Fast Track Racing in the team's No. 10 car in the season-opener at Daytona. It then looked like Huff would be the full-time driver of that car that year, replacing Tommy Vigh Jr., as he drove the car in the next five races. However, Fast Track replaced him with Mike Basham for the race at Iowa as well as other races throughout the season.

Huff made his NASCAR Truck Series debut in the second race of the doubleheader at Kansas in 2020 driving the No. 00 for Reaume Brothers Racing. He finished 19th in the race. Huff ran one more Truck Series race in 2020 at Richmond in the Cram Racing Enterprises No. 41.

In 2021, Huff was scheduled to drive part-time in the Truck Series for CMI Motorsports in their No. 83 truck beginning at the season-opener at Daytona. When it was announced that Tim Viens would instead be driving the No. 83 truck in that race, CMI revealed in a tweet that Huff would instead drive for them in other races. However, Huff did not end up running any races for the team in 2021. Huff started his own ARCA team that year, Huff Racing, with himself driving the No. 36 car in the races at Talladega and Pocono. He and his team also entered the races at Daytona and Talladega in 2022. Huff returned to the Truck Series for the spring race at Kansas in 2022, driving the No. 46 for G2G Racing, which looked very similar to the truck at Darlington which Brennan Poole drove.

Motorsports career results

NASCAR
(key) (Bold – Pole position awarded by qualifying time. Italics – Pole position earned by points standings or practice time. * – Most laps led.)

Camping World Truck Series

ARCA Menards Series
(key) (Bold – Pole position awarded by qualifying time. Italics – Pole position earned by points standings or practice time. * – Most laps led.)

 Season still in progress
 Ineligible for series points

References

External links
 

2001 births
Living people
NASCAR drivers
ARCA Menards Series drivers
Sportspeople from Williamsburg, Virginia
Racing drivers from Virginia